Mancoa is a genus of flowering plants belonging to the family Brassicaceae.

Its native range is Mexico to Peru, and to Northwestern Argentina.

Species
Species:

Mancoa bracteata 
Mancoa foliosa 
Mancoa hispida 
Mancoa laevis 
Mancoa laxa 
Mancoa mexicana 
Mancoa perennis 
Mancoa rollinsiana 
Mancoa venturii

References

Brassicaceae
Brassicaceae genera